Dorila Castell de Orozco (8 December 1845 – 20 September 1930) was an Uruguayan poet and teacher who wrote in various publications under the pseudonym Una Oriental.

Biography
Dorila Castell de Orozco was born in San Carlos, Uruguay on 8 December 1845 to Francisco Castell and Adelaida Ducrosé. She studied in Buenos Aires, graduating in 1865 as a teacher. From there, she moved to Paysandú and opened a school for girls in the north of the city, inspiring her younger sister, Adela Castell, to continue her own education and eventually come to work in Paysandú.

Her writings would also appear in the Buenos Aires paper La alborada literaria del Plata, owned by Josefina Pelliza de Sagasta and Dolores Larrosa de Ansaldi as well as Julio Herrera y Reissig's La Revista.

Citations

References

 
 

1845 births
1930 deaths
Uruguayan women writers
People from San Carlos, Uruguay
Uruguayan women poets
Uruguayan women educators